Ampère Seamount is a seamount in the Atlantic Ocean,  south-west of Portugal and  west of Morocco.

In March 1974, Soviet research ship Academician Petrovsky underwent an expedition to explore the Ampere and Josephine seamounts. Underwater photographs taken during this expedition revealed a stone wall which included cut stone blocks scattered on both sides, Also what appear to be artificial steps partially covered with lava were photographed on the flat summit of the Ampere Seamount. This was the grounds for speculations that it may have been the location of the legendary Atlantis.

References 

 Hatzky, Jörn (2005), PANGAEA: Physiography of the Ampère Seamount in the Horseshoe Seamount chain off Gibraltar. Alfred Wegener Institute, Helmholtz Centre for Polar and Marine Research, Bremerhaven
 Marine Regions · Ampère Seamount 
 Published: 02 October 2014 The fish fauna of Ampère Seamount (NE Atlantic) and the adjacent abyssal plain Bernd Christiansen, Rui P. Vieira, Sabine Christiansen, Anneke Denda, Frederico Oliveira & Jorge M. S. Gonçalves  Helgoland Marine Research 
 Seamount Information: Ampere Seamount
 Biodiversity Inventorial Atlas of macrobenthic seamount  animals,  Friedrich-Alexander Universität Erlangen Nürnberg
  Ampere Seamount seafloor sampling

Seamounts of the Atlantic Ocean